GSAT-16 is the 11th Indian communication satellite, meant to increase the number of transponders available for satellite-based telecommunication, television, and VSAT services in India. GSAT-16 is similar to GSAT-15 with each satellite weighing 3,150 kg and having power generation capacity of 6.8 kW.

Launch
Initially launch was planned for 4 December 2014, but was postponed due to inclement weather. GSAT-16 was finally launched on 6 December 2014  from the Guiana Space Centre, French Guiana, by an Ariane 5 rocket.

Payload
The satellite is equipped with 12 ku, 24 C and 12 Extended C band transponders. The satellite also has the highest Indian ku-beacon transmitter.

Satellite
GSAT-16 will be the 11th among GSAT series of Indian communication satellites, and will have estimated lifespan of 12 years. It will support civil aviation services apart from backing up the services provided by other communication satellites. The satellite is aimed as a replacement for satellite INSAT-3E

Cost
The satellite was insured for 865 crore. The Department of Space had approved 800 crore for the satellite in financial year 2013–14.

See also 

 Indian Regional Navigational Satellite System
 Global Navigation Satellite System
 GPS
 GSAT

References

External links
 ISRO Future Programmes

GSAT satellites
Spacecraft launched in 2014
2014 in India
Ariane commercial payloads